

J. Elfreth Watkins Sr.
John Elfreth Watkins Sr. (1852–1903) was Curator of Mechanical Technology at the United States National Museum (Smithsonian Institution). He received his education at Lafayette College, graduating in 1871, and worked first for the Delaware and Hudson Canal Company, as a mining engineer, for a year, and then for the Pennsylvania Railroad as assistant engineer of construction. Disabled in 1873 by an accident that resulted in the loss of his right leg, he was reassigned to the Amboy division of the railroad. In 1883 he became chief clerk of the Camden and Atlantic Railroad and in 1884 chief clerk of the Amboy division of the Pennsylvania Railroad. 

In that same year, he became Honorary Curator of Transportation at the National Museum, taking the job full-time after two years. He left to organize the Pennsylvania Railroad's exhibits at the 1893 World's Columbian Exposition; stayed in Chicago for a year organizing the Department of Industrial Arts at the Field Columbian Museum; and then returned to the Smithsonian, where he was curator of Mechanical Technology until his death in 1903. 

He played a key role in the preservation of the John Bull steam locomotive and its subsequent public displays by the Smithsonian Institution.

J. Elfreth Watkins Jr.

In 1900, his son John Elfreth Watkins Jr. (1875–?) contributed an article to the Ladies' Home Journal, entitled What May Happen in the Next Hundred Years.
Watkins Jr.'s predictions were remarkably accurate for 1900.

References

 Massa, William R., Jr., Smithsonian Institution (2004) Finding Aids to Personal Papers and Special Collections in the Smithsonian Institution Archives: Record Unit 7268; J. Elfreth Watkins Collection, 1869, 1881–1903, 1953, 1966 and undated, Retrieved March 3, 2008.
 Genealogy information
Marcus Benjamin, "John Elfreth Watkins," Science September 4, 1903, NS VOL XVIII Number 453, p. 300 
 

1852 births
1903 deaths
American people in rail transportation
Smithsonian Institution people
American civil engineers